Ye Yang may refer to:

Yang Ye (gymnast) (born 1994), Chinese rhythmic gymnast
Ting Shan-hsi (1935–2009), Chinese filmmaker and screenwriter, also credited under his pen name Er Yang or Ye Yang

See also
Yang Yong-eun (born 1972), South Korean golfer, known as Y.E. Yang in the west
Yang Ye (died 986), general of the Northern Han and Song dynasties